Prema Oka Maikam is a 2013 Telugu film directed by Chandu. It was released on 30 August 2013 and stars Charmy Kaur, Rahul, and Saranya Nag as the lead characters. The film's script was written by Chandu and Pulagam Chinnarayana, who worked as the script's dialogue writer.

Prema Oka Maikam has been described as "a film for men, especially for those men who enjoy being drowsy and drowned into love, lust or wine" and Chandu commented that Charmy "has given soul to the character and will win all the hearts".

Synopsis
The film follows Mallika (Charmy Kaur) an intelligent and independent young woman that works as a call girl but refuses to take just any man that comes along. When poet Lalith (Rahul) and Mallika have a chance meeting, the two connect instantly. Swathi (Saranya Nag) is a singer that gained her popularity after appearing on a television talent show, but ends up getting drawn into a love triangle between Mallika and Lalith.

Cast
 Charmy Kaur as Mallika
 Rahul Haridas as Lalith
 Saranya Nag as Swathi
 Ravi Babu
 Rao Ramesh as Vamshi
 Chandra Mohan
 Thagubothu Ramesh
 Surekha Vani
 Jackie
 Pruthvi (30 Years Industry)
 Chanti
 Satish
 Sony Charishta
 Saraswati Amma

Production 
Development on Prema Oka Maikam began in 2012 and Charmi Kaur was announced to perform one of the lead roles. Chandu denied claims that Kaur was hired to "boost the movie's glamour quotient" and stated that they chose her because they believed that she could perform the role and that "we felt she was apt, but not because to add glamor". Footage for Prema Oka Maikam was shot in Bangalore and Hyderabad and the film went into post production in early 2013. The film initially had a projected release date of February 2013, but was pushed back to an August release.

The film's music was written by MGK Praveen who composed 3 songs for “Prema Oka Maikam” and the other 3 songs were composed by SR Posam .

Soundtrack

Reception
IndiaGlitz panned the movie, remarking that it was "easily the year's worst ever movie". The reviewer commented that the background music was "annoying and highly inappropriate",  and that the narration was "downright stupid".

References

2013 films
2010s Telugu-language films